Arendsee-Kalbe was a Verwaltungsgemeinschaft ("collective municipality") in the Altmarkkreis Salzwedel (district), in Saxony-Anhalt, Germany. It was situated east of Salzwedel, and north of Gardelegen. The seat of the Verwaltungsgemeinschaft was in Arendsee. It was disbanded on 1 January 2010.

The Verwaltungsgemeinschaft Arendsee-Kalbe consisted of the following municipalities:

Former Verwaltungsgemeinschaften in Saxony-Anhalt